ShellZ Zhu is a Chinese model and actress.

Biography
Born in Nanjing, China, ShellZ moved to Hong Kong as an early adolescent. After moving to Hong Kong, she began to initially garner public recognition through theatrical performances of traditional Chinese dance. At age 17, she transitioned from dance to modeling, as she began to promote fashion, commercial attire, editorials, and print-outs. While still modeling, she was offered her first movie role in the Hong Kong film Gorgeous. After acting in Chinese language Hong Kong movies, ShellZ moved to Hollywood, California to further her acting career. While in the United States, she was offered acting roles in Hollywood hits, such as Steven Spielberg's The Terminal and Michael Mann's Collateral. Before returning to Hong Kong in 2008, ShellZ (Stage name: Siu wai Cheung on IMDB) accepted a major role in the feature film Extra Ordinary Barry. In the film "Hard Fall" she plays lead role Veronica.

Personal life
Shell Z currently resides in Hong Kong S.A.R. She enjoys dressage, singing, and badminton. She is also an autoracing enthusiast, and actively participates in karting. Shell Z is fluent in English, Cantonese, and Mandarin, and maintains basic proficiency in Japanese.

Selected filmography

Film 
Flashes (in production)
Hard Fall (2009)- Nominated for the best film in AIFF
Lumina(2009)-On YouTube//lumina webisode 2, 3 and 7
Extra Ordinary Barry (2008)
The Terminal (2005)
Naked in the 21st Century (2004)
The Blood Rules (2002)
Conspiracy (2000)
Resort Massacre (2000)
Boh Lee Chyn-Gorgeous (Jackie Chan Production-1998)
In Love With Industry (Hong Kong Production-1997)

Television 
Human Trafficking - Lead (Girl Right next door) (LifeTime Television)
The View Show-RunWay, Entertainer (ABC Studios, NYC)
Ripley's Believe It Or Not - an episode (with Kelly Packard-NYC)
Ananda Lewis Show - Runway Model (CBS Studio, NYC)
Call Any Time Talk Show - Host (Hong Kong i-Cable TV)

References

External links

Shell Z Zhu
Shelly Zhu

Living people
Chinese female models
Hong Kong film actresses
Hong Kong female models
Hong Kong television actresses
Actresses from Jiangsu
Actresses from Nanjing
Year of birth missing (living people)
Chinese film actresses
Chinese television actresses
20th-century Chinese actresses
21st-century Chinese actresses
20th-century Hong Kong actresses
21st-century Hong Kong actresses